Allen T. Lucas (July 20, 1917 — November 18, 1973) was an American lawyer and politician.

Lucas was born in Chandlerville, Illinois. He went to the Chandlerville public schools. He also went to the Phillips Exeter Academy  the University of Illinois, Northwestern University and DePaul University. Lucas served in the United States Navy during World War II. Lucas was admitted to the Illinois bar and he practiced law with his uncle Scott W. Lucas who served in the United States Senate. Lucas served in the Illinois House of Representatives from 1955 to 1969 and was a Democrat. Lucas died at St. John's Hospital in Springfield, Illinois.

Notes

1917 births
1973 deaths
People from Cass County, Illinois
Military personnel from Illinois
Illinois lawyers
Phillips Exeter Academy alumni
Northwestern University alumni
University of Illinois alumni
DePaul University alumni
Democratic Party members of the Illinois House of Representatives
20th-century American politicians
20th-century American lawyers